Zoltán Halász (23 June 1960 – 9 August 2022) was a Hungarian cyclist. He competed in the individual road race and team time trial events at the 1980 Summer Olympics.

References

External links
 

1960 births
2022 deaths
Hungarian male cyclists
Olympic cyclists of Hungary
Cyclists at the 1980 Summer Olympics
People from Szekszárd
Sportspeople from Tolna County